The Sylamore Scenic Byway is a scenic route in the Arkansas Scenic Byways program. It passes through undeveloped forest land as a scenic route to Blanchard Springs Caverns.

Route description
The Sylamore Scenic Byway begins at the National Forest Service Blanchard Springs Caverns Visitor Center. The Mirror Lake Historic District is listed on the National Register of Historic Places. The route runs west along Forest Highway 1110. It turns onto Highway 14, which winds east past an intersection with Highway 87 to Allison near the White River. The Sylamore Creek Byway begins an overlap with Highway 5 and Highway 9 northbound, following the White River and passing the Miles Jeffery Barn. It passes through Optimus, an unincorporated community, before terminating at a bridge over the White River.

History

The Sylamore Scenic Byway was designated as a National Forest Scenic Byway on February 8, 1989.

Major intersections

Gallery

See also
 
 
 List of Arkansas state highways

References

External links

 

Transportation in Stone County, Arkansas
Arkansas Scenic Byways
Ozark–St. Francis National Forest
National Forest Scenic Byways